The Baron Knoop Stradivarius of 1698 is an antique violin made by luthier Antonio Stradivari of Cremona (1644-1736).

See also
List of Stradivarius instruments
Stradivarius
Baron Johann Knoop

External links
 

1698 works
Stradivari violins
Stradivari instruments